Rufous-rumped grassbird has been split into two species:
 Indian grassbird, 	Graminicola bengalensis
 Chinese grassbird, 	Graminicola striatus

Animal common name disambiguation pages